Narukerä is a Finnish bandy team based in the town of Pori in the Satakunta region of Finland. The 1965 established team has won two Finnish bandy championships, in 1999 and 2023, but has got 13 medals in total, most recently bronze in 2022. Narukerä plays in the top-tier league of Finland, Bandyliiga. Narukerä plays its home games on the Karhupaana (officially Porin tekojäärata) in the Isomäki district of Pori.

History 
Narukerä was established in 1965. It got its first ever medal in the top-tier in 1998 when it won bronze. Narukerä got their first gold medal the following year when it won the championship in 1999.

Narukerä won their second championship in 2023.

Home ice and clubhouse 
Narukerä's home ice is the Porin tekojäärata, which is located in the Pori sports center in the Isomäki district. The artificial ice rink was constructed in 1985. Before the artificial ice was constructed, bandy was played on natural ice on the frozen field at the Pori sports center and before that on the Herralahti ice. The artificial ice rink's grandstand has a roof and is heated, the grandstand was completed in 1995. The Narukerä clubhouse was built next to the ice in 2005. The upper floor has club facilities and an office and announcement room, and the lower floor has a kiosk and a cafe.

Honors

SM-liiga/Bandyliiga 
 Winner (2): 1998–99, 2022–23

 Runner-up (3): 2004–05, 2011–12, 2012–13

 Bronze (8): 1997–98, 2001–02, 2005–06, 2006–07, 2009–10, 2010–11, 2020–21, 2021–22

Finnish Cup 
 Winner (1): 2022–23

Players

Notable alumni 
 Pertti Ratsula
 Pertti Juhola
 Kalevi Ruuttu
 Erkki Väkiparta
 Vladimir Plavunov
 Aleksander Pershin
 Juri Pershin
 Kimmo Kivelä
 Oleg Tchekoubach
 Jarno Väkiparta
 Markku Huhtanen
 Ville Aaltonen
 Timo Oksanen
 Lauri Arponen
 Patrick Suves

Retired numbers

See also 

 Isomäki (Pori)
 Bandyliiga
 List of Finnish bandy champions

References

External links

Bandy clubs in Finland
Bandy clubs established in 1965

Sport in Pori